Arthur L. Williams may refer to:

Arthur Leonard Williams (politician) (1904–1972), British politician and Governor General of Mauritius
Arthur Llewellyn Williams (1856–1919), Episcopal bishop
Arthur L. Williams Jr. (born 1942), billionaire insurance executive

See also
Arthur Williams (disambiguation)